Robert "Bob" Gordon Vogel (born 7 October 1981) is a professional marksman, competition shooter, and National/World champion.  He is the only Law Enforcement Officer ever to win World and National Championships in the Practical Pistol Disciplines of IPSC and USPSA.

Robert was born and raised on a farm in rural Saint Marys, Ohio where he became heavily involved in shooting, hunting and the outdoors from a very young age. After graduating high school in 2000 he went immediately into a 2-year Police Academy program.  It was also at this time that he began competing in practical shooting competitions.  At present, Robert is a 2-time world champion and 17-time national champion across 3 disciplines of practical and combat shooting.  Besides this, he has been a Police Officer for over 10 years.  Eight and a half of those years were spent as a full-time street cop while also being a member of the county's joint-department SWAT team.  During that tenure he served as a firearm instructor for both the department and the SWAT team.

Vogel won the USPSA National Championship in the Production Division two years in a row (2008 and 2009). In 2011, he won the Limited-10 Division. He has also won two world championships in Production and Stock-Pistol Division. He is currently ranked as a Grand Master in four USPSA Divisions, and as a Distinguished Master in four IDPA Divisions.

In 2012, Vogel appeared as an expert in the fourth season of History Channel's Top Shot.

Achievements

 IPSC World Champion (Production)
 IDPA World Champion (Stock Pistol)
 4x USPSA National Champion (Production & Limited 10)
 6x IDPA National Champion (Stock, Enhanced, Custom)
 6x IDPA Indoor National Champion (Stock & Enhanced)
 IPSC National Champion (Production)
 3x Pro-Am Professional Champion (Limited & Open)
 3x IDPA Carolina Cup Champion
 6x USPSA Area Champion (Areas 5,6,8)
 11x Indiana State Champion (USPSA & IDPA)
 7x Ohio State Champion (USPSA & IDPA)
 7x Michigan State Champion (USPSA & IDPA)
 7x IDPA Great Lakes Regional Champion

References

External links
Official website

Living people
IPSC shooters
IPSC World Shoot Champions
American male sport shooters
American police officers
1981 births